Jack Power, also known as Mass Master, and formerly as Counterweight and Destroyer, is a fictional character appearing in American comic books published by Marvel Comics. He first appeared in Power Pack #1 and was created by Louise Simonson and June Brigman.

Publication history 
Jack was a founding member of the superhero team Power Pack. The second youngest of the four Power siblings, he was  years old when he was given his powers by Aelfyre Whitemane, a dying Kymellian noble. He continued to operate with Power Pack through their entire history.

Fictional character biography 
Jack Power was born in Richmond, Virginia. Brash and ornery, Jack was the "wild child" of the Power siblings. He frequently insulted and argued with both his teammates and his adversaries. Queen Maraud, Power Pack's archenemy, feared him more than the other children because she thought he would be the most likely to take advantage of the lethal nature of his powers.

However, his bold nature also made him a key fighter for the team. He possessed a tremendous amount of loyalty and courage, and usually kept a cool head even during stressful situations. Jack jumped into the East River to help his sister Katie escape from an ocean liner. He even taunted the Snark Jakal who was about to kill him with "Can't even kill someone until Mommy tells you to?!".

Jack was perhaps the most innovative member of the Pack in terms of developing new power variations. When he received new powers, he was able to figure them out quickly and invent new uses for them. He was significantly better at controlling his gravity powers than Alex.

In later stories, Jack retained his bold personality, but also showed a kinder, gentler side, opting to leave the team to care for his mother.

Age discrepancies 
Jack was 8 in the original series; in the 2000 miniseries, he was 12, though this would suggest Jack had aged four years where his siblings had aged only three. Considering Julie Power, his older sister of two years, is now 17, Jack may now be 15 by proxy if his age in the 2000 miniseries factors canon to Marvel writers. In the All Ages 2005 miniseries comics (set in an alternate universe), Jack is 10.

Powers and abilities 
 Jack's first power was control over his own density. Initially, he was only able to turn himself into a cloudy, gaseous form. After a while, he learned how to make himself small and dense. Jack's major defenses were his ability to "go cloudy" and escape from people who were physically attacking him, and the "Jack Hammer", in which he dropped onto his enemies in his super-dense form. Several years later, Jack was able to create the molecular density force field first used by his sister Julie as Molecula.
 Jack later gained his brother Alex's gravity powers. He could de-gravitize himself and anything he touched, float, and increase gravitational force. Jack modified his powers by developing the "Super-G" punch, in which he used a super-gravitized fist to hit his adversaries. With this tactic, Jack was able to knock out Arclight during the Mutant Massacre. Jack refused to use the wings that Alex had used in order to fly and took the name Counterweight.
 Jack then gained the energy powers previously held by Katie and Alex. The energy powers allowed him to disintegrate matter and convert it into stored energy, as well as absorb existing energy directed against him. He could then project this stored energy as explosive spheres (referred to as "power balls"). During this time, he took the name Destroyer.
 Jack eventually regained his original powers and took on his original codename of Mass Master.

Along with his siblings, Jack possessed Kymellian healing powers. Usually, he was required to work with his siblings to generate and use this ability, but he occasionally accessed it on his own.

With his siblings, Jack owned a Kymellian smartship, Friday. The ship acted as an unofficial team advisor and accompanied the Pack on several missions.

Jack wears a costume of unstable molecules created by Friday. The costume exists in an extra-dimensional space known as "Elsewhere" until summoned by voice command (the wearer would say the words "costume on!"). The costume also houses a communicator which is used to communicate with Friday, and was later modified to include a mask. As with all the team's costumes, the pockets of the costume can be used as an access point to Elsewhere itself, where the cartoon-like creatures known simply as "The Tailors" reside in a colorful wonderland of talking dinosaurs, enchanted forests, mad monarchs, surreal architecture, and malleable physical laws.

Other versions

Avengers and Power Pack Assemble! 
In issues #3 & #4 of the Avengers and Power Pack Assemble! miniseries, a 20-year-old Jack Power appeared in an alternate timeline. Having had his powers disrupted by Kang; Jack was stuck in his cloud form, and had to remain in a sealed, upgraded Iron Man-type armor to keep from dissipating.

Fantastic Four and Power Pack 
Within issue #4 of the Fantastic Four and Power Pack miniseries, Jack is called by his full name, which is Jonathan. It is unknown whether this name is the same for the 616 version of Mass Master.

Millennial Visions 
In the "Power Pack: Starting Over" story within Marvel's 2001 Millennial Visions one-shot comic, Jack was depicted as a 28-year-old drifter who had undergone treatment for addiction in rehab. He was also forced to remain in cloudy form, having lost the control to regain his solid shape.

References 

Characters created by Louise Simonson
Comics characters introduced in 1984
Fictional characters from Virginia
Marvel Comics mutates
Marvel Comics male superheroes
Marvel Comics characters with accelerated healing
Fictional characters with density control abilities
Fictional characters who can change size
Marvel Comics child superheroes
Power Pack